Aspidogastridae is a family of trematodes in the order Aspidogastrida.

Genera
Subfamily Aspidogastrinae Poche, 1907
Aspidogaster Baer, 1827
Lobatostoma Eckmann, 1932
Lophotapsis Looss, 1902
Multicotyle Dawes, 1941
Neosychnocotyle Snyder & Tkach, 2007
Sychnocotyle Ferguson, Cribb & Smales, 1999
Subfamily Cotylaspidinae Chauhan, 1954
Cotylapsis Leidy, 1857
Cotylogaster Monticelli, 1892
Lissemysia Sinha, 1935
Subfamily Rohdellinae Gibson & Chinabut, 1984
Rohdella Gibson & Chinabut, 1984

References

Aspidogastrea
Trematode families
Taxa named by Franz Poche